William Sprague, also known as William III or William Sprague III (November 3, 1799October 19, 1856), was a politician and industrialist from the U.S. state of Rhode Island, serving as the 14th Governor, a U.S. Representative and a U.S. Senator. He was the uncle of William Sprague IV, also a Governor and Senator from Rhode Island.

Biography
William Sprague was the son of William Sprague [1773-1836] and Anna Potter [1763-1828]. He was born in the Gov. William Sprague Mansion in Cranston, Rhode Island, and pursued classical studies as a student. He engaged in mercantile pursuits and was a member of the Rhode Island House of Representatives, serving as speaker from 1832 to 1835 and leading a coalition of Anti-Masonic and Democratic Party members.

He was elected as an at-large candidate from the Whig Party to the Twenty-fourth Congress and served from March 4, 1835, to March 3, 1837. He declined to be a candidate for renomination in 1836. He was elected Governor of Rhode Island in 1838. He subsequently was elected as a Whig to the United States Senate to fill the vacancy caused by the death of Nathan F. Dixon and served from February 18, 1842, to January 17, 1844, when he resigned. He served as chairman of the United States Senate Committee on Enrolled Bills in the Twenty-seventh Congress. He was a U.S. presidential elector on the Whig ticket in 1848.

His family fortune came from the cotton and paint manufacturing, and he assumed active control of the family business following the murder of his brother Amasa on December 31, 1843. The Senator took an active interest in the trial of the Gordon brothers for the murder. The trial resulted in one of the defendants being sent to the gallows, and remains highly controversial for the amount of anti-Irish bigotry involved. In 2011, the condemned man was posthumously pardoned by the Rhode Island governor.

In addition to the family business, he was president of the Hartford, Providence, and Fishkill Railroad, and of two banks. The extended Sprague family has descendants who live in the Utica, New York area.
Sprague died in Providence, Rhode Island, and is interred in Swan Point Cemetery there.

References

Further reading
Hoffman, Charles, and Hoffman, Tess. Brotherliy Love: Murder and the Politics of Prejudice in Nineteenth-Century Rhode Island. Amherst: The University of Massachusetts Press, 1993.
Knight, Benjamin. History of the Sprague Families, of Rhode Island. Santa Cruz: H. Coffin, 1881.
Warwick Beacon 29 May 2003 Lifebeats section, "Historic Homes" by Don D'Amato on Sprague's anti-masonic politics

External links

William Sprague at National Governors Association
William Sprague (1799–1856) entry at The Political Graveyard

William Sprague's 1932 Anti-Masonic Ticket from the Rhode Island State Archives
	
	

|-

1799 births
1856 deaths
Governors of Rhode Island
Members of the United States House of Representatives from Rhode Island
Speakers of the Rhode Island House of Representatives
Democratic Party members of the Rhode Island House of Representatives
United States senators from Rhode Island
Politicians from Cranston, Rhode Island
Rhode Island Whigs
Anti-Masonic Party politicians from Rhode Island
Whig Party United States senators
Burials at Swan Point Cemetery
Whig Party members of the United States House of Representatives
19th-century American politicians
Whig Party state governors of the United States